Frankenstein in Baghdad is an Arabic novel written by the Iraqi writer Ahmed Saadawi. It won the IPAF award (International Prize for Arabic Fiction) for 2014. The novel was translated into English by Jonathan Wright.

The novel is a wartime spin on Mary Shelley's 1818 novel Frankenstein; or, The Modern Prometheus.

Since 2018 the book is also available as an audiobook at Kitabsawti.com.

Plot 
In the aftermath of the U.S. invasion of Iraq, a junk-dealer named Hadi al-Attag collects the scattered body parts of bomb victims with the intention of giving them a proper burial. Al-Attag first stitches the body parts together to create a single body, calling it "Whatsitsname", but when he leaves the body alone, the spirit of another bomb victim enters the corpse and brings it to life. Whatsitsname starts out on a mission of vengeance, killing those he considers responsible for the deaths of the bomb victims, but his actions spin out of control when he begins justifying the murder of other people for valuable body parts, raising questions around guilt, innocence and justice.

Reception 
The New York Times stated that the novel "blends the unearthly, the horrific and the mundane to terrific effect". A review in Haaretz called Saadawi's writing style clever, combining "compassionate moments of grace and sympathy" with "macabre humor that adds a cynical view of the goings-on". British reviewer Sarah Perry suggested that the novel evokes Kafka as well as Shelley, its story emphasizing the pointlessness and surrealism of war.

References

Arabic-language novels
Iraqi novels
Iraq War in fiction
Frankenstein novels
2013 novels
Fictional people from Baghdad